Letters Never Sent is the 16th studio album by American singer-songwriter Carly Simon, released by Arista Records, on November 1, 1994.

Simon has stated the inspiration for the album came when she found an old box of letters that she'd written, but never mailed. She wrote "Like a River" in honor of her mother, Andrea Simon, and "Touched by the Sun" for her dear friend, Jackie Onassis, both of whom died from cancer in 1994.

The album features backing vocals by Marc Cohn and Simon's son Ben Taylor (who also appears as vocalist on "Time Works on All the Wild Young Men", the bridge song between the fourth and sixth tracks). Andreas Vollenweider plays the harp on the track "Davy".

Promotion and reception

Simon made music videos for the songs "Like a River" and "Touched by the Sun". She performed "Touched by the Sun" on the Late Show with David Letterman on two occasions. Simon also embarked on a co-headlining tour with Hall & Oates in support of the album.

Entertainment Weekly graded the album B+, and wrote "Simon dug up her old, unsent letters — to people unnamed, but not necessarily unidentifiable — and set them to music. The results are funky, fascinating, and sumptuous. A daring move that pays off." AllMusic wrote that the album "represents a fresh start" and that "Simon has returned to passion as her main subject matter, confessing, "I can never be in love, I can only be in heat." She gives off that heat in many of the album's songs" and concluded "It's an unusually coquettish performance for a woman of 49, and practically weightless."

Awards

Track listing
Credits adapted from the album's liner notes.

Live at Grand Central
Live at Grand Central is a 1995 concert special that aired on Lifetime Television. Performed in the middle of New York City's Grand Central Terminal, the surprise concert was a prelude to Simon's first concert tour in 14 years. It was directed by English music video and film director Nigel Dick, and runs 60 minutes. It was released on VHS and LaserDisc latter the same year.

For this special, Simon was nominated for two CableACE Award's, winning one.

Personnel

Musicians

Production

Charts
Album – Billboard (United States)

References

External links
 Carly Simon's Official Website

1994 albums
Carly Simon albums
Albums arranged by Arif Mardin
Albums produced by Frank Filipetti
Arista Records albums